Peter Schlesinger  (born April 2, 1948 in Los Angeles, California) is an American artist, author, and former artist's model, perhaps most well known for being the subject in numerous notable canvases by the British painter David Hockney.

Biography
Peter Schlesinger was an 18-year-old student at UCLA when he met the then 28-year-old artist David Hockney, who was teaching a summer class at the university. They began a long affair; Schlesinger relocated with Hockney to London, where he subsequently undertook to study at the Slade School of Art. Whilst in a relationship with Hockney, he was often the artist's subject and muse; he appears in some of Hockney's best-known works, including Portrait of an Artist (Pool with Two Figures) (1972)—which, in 2018, sold for over $90 million, setting the monetary record for a painting by a living artist—, Peter Schlesinger with Polaroid Camera, and Peter Getting Out of Nick's Pool.

Schlesinger went on to pursue his own career as a visual artist, creating sculptures, paintings, and photographs.

Books
His photography is the subject of two volumes for which he also wrote the text; A Chequered Past (2003, Thames and Hudson) and Peter Schlesinger: A Photographic Memory 1968–1989 (2015, Damiani; co-authored with Hilton Als).

Personal life
The 1974 film A Bigger Splash (named after Hockney's famous painting) is about the breakup of Schlesinger's relationship with Hockney.

Schlesinger's current partner is the Swedish photographer Eric Bowman, with whom he shares a home in Bellport on Long Island.

References

External links
 The artist's website – 

1948 births
Living people
American sculptors
American photographers
American LGBT photographers
People from Los Angeles
Muses
American gay artists